is a children's fantasy novel written by Eiko Kadono and illustrated by Akiko Hayashi. It was first published by Fukuinkan Shoten on January 25, 1985. It is the basis of the 1989 Studio Ghibli anime film of the same title and of the 2014 live action film also of the same name.

The book won numerous awards in Japan. Encouraged by this and by the success of the Ghibli film, Kadono has written eight more novels over a period of more than thirty-five years. The most recent was published in January 2022.

Synopsis
The book follows Kiki, a young witch from a long line of witches on her mother's side.  Kiki is now thirteen and must spend a year on her own in a town without other witches, proving that she can make a living. Accompanied by her talking black cat Jiji, Kiki starts a delivery service by flying on her broom. Over the year notable misadventures include:

 Losing a stuffed toy cat and using Jiji as a substitute until she can recover the lost toy.
 Saving a child from the ocean during a day at the beach.
 Recovering her broom that has been stolen by a flying enthusiast.
 Posing for a portrait and then delivering it to a town art showing.
 Getting a giant knitted , or "belly warmer," to a ship out at sea from an eccentric knitting old woman.
 Figuring out what to do when the clock tower breaks down on New Year's Eve.
 Delivering musical instruments to a concert after they were left on a train by a haughty group of musicians.

After a year of self-doubt and some setbacks, Kiki returns home in triumph, but then soon decides to return to the city and her delivery business.

Development

Title interpretation
The word takkyūbin (宅急便, literally home-fast-mail) in the Japanese title is a trademark of Yamato Transport, though it is used today as a synonym for takuhaibin (宅配便, literally home-delivery-mail). The company not only approved the use of the trademark — though its permission was not required under Japanese trademark laws — but also enthusiastically sponsored the anime film version of the book, as the company uses a stylized depiction of a black cat carrying her kitten as its corporate logo.

Translations
Non-Japanese versions of Majo no Takkyūbin were not published until 2003 when the book became available in English, Italian, Korean and Chinese.  The Swedish and Indonesian editions were published in 2006. The Russian version was released in 2018 and the French one in 2019.

Differences in title
Not all translations of the book follow the original title. Some include the name of the central character.
Kiki's Delivery Service (English edition), named for the English dub of the Studio Ghibli film
Kiki, consegne a domicilio (Italian edition), translates as Kiki, Home Deliveries
 魔女宅急便 (Mónǚ Zháijíbiàn) (Chinese edition)
Kikis Expressbud (Swedish edition), translates as Kiki's Fast Delivery 
 Titipan Kilat Penyihir (Indonesian edition) 
 Ведьмина служба доставки (Russian edition)
 Kiki la petite sorcière (French edition), translates as Kiki the Little Witch

English editions
The first English edition was translated by Lynne E. Riggs, with cover by Irvin Cheung, retaining the original illustrations by Akiko Hayashi, and released on February 1, 2003 by Annick Press in paperback. The book is 176 pages long and, like the original Japanese edition, has eleven chapters. A new English translation by Emily Balistrieri and illustrated by Yuta Onoda was released in hardcover by Delacorte Press on July 7, 2020. Another hardcover version, illustrated Joe Todd-Stanton, was released by Penguin Books under their Puffin Books imprint on August 20, 2020 and in paperback on July 1, 2021. They also released the Yuta Onoda-illustrated version in paperback under the Yearling Books imprint on June 8, 2021.

Related media

Film adaptations
 
The book was adapted in 1989 as an animated film by Hayao Miyazaki and Studio Ghibli. Disney was also interested in its own live-action take on Kiki in 2005 with Jeff Stockwell writing the script and Susan Montford, Don Murphy, and Mark Gordon as producers, but no developments have emerged since then.

A live-action film adaptation with the same name directed by Takashi Shimizu was released on March 1, 2014. The film is based on the first two novels and has figure skater turned actress Fuka Koshiba playing Kiki. It premiered in Japan on March 1, 2014.

Novel sequels

Musicals
In 1993, a musical version of the story was produced. Yukio Ninagawa wrote the script and Kensuke Yokouchi directed the show. The role of Kiki was portrayed by Youki Kudoh and the role of Tombo was portrayed by Akira Akasaka. Akasaka was replaced by Katsuyuki Mori within the year. A cast recording was produced by the original cast, and the show was revived in 1995 and 1996.

Another musical, based on Ghibli's film, ran at the Southwark Playhouse in the UK from December 8, 2016 to January 8, 2017. It was adapted by Jessica Sian and directed by Katie Hewitt.

In 2017, another musical version was produced, written and directed by Koki Kishimoto. It was revived in 2018 and 2021.

Awards and nominations
23rd Noma Award for Juvenile Literature
34th Shogakukan Award for Children's Literature
Hans Christian Andersen Award 2018
Holds a place on the IBBY Honour List for 1986

References

External links
  

1985 novels
Japanese fantasy novels
Children's fantasy novels
Witchcraft in written fiction
Japanese novels adapted into films
Japanese children's novels
1985 children's books